Desiree Lowry Rodríguez (born June 25, 1972, in San Juan) is a Puerto Rican beauty pageant titleholder, fashion model, TV host, radio presenter, event coordinator, model agency owner, and former pageant director for Miss Universe Puerto Rico.

Early life
Lowry was born on June 25, 1972, in San Juan, Puerto Rico to a Puerto Rican mother and an Irish American father from Oregon. She was raised in Corozal. She speaks Spanish and English. She learned English from her father who refused to speak to her unless she spoke to him in English.

Pageant participation

Miss Puerto Rico 1995
On August 6, 1994, at Teatro Yagüez, in Mayagüez, Puerto Rico, Desiree Lowry won the title of Miss Puerto Rico 1995, gaining the right to represent Puerto Rico at Miss Universe 1995. She was crowned by Miss Puerto Rico 1979 Teresa López and Miss Puerto Rico 1984 Sandra Beauchamp.

Miss Universe 1995
Desiree traveled to Windhoek, Namibia to compete in Miss Universe 1995 where she placed in the Top 6 (5th overall). The eventual winner was Chelsi Smith of the United States.

Preliminary competition scores:

Swimsuit - 8.88
Evening Gown - 9.58
Interview - 9.333

Final Scores
Interview - 9.65
Swimsuit - 9.56
Gown - 9.66

Miss Universe Puerto Rico franchise

In 2009, Lowry, along with Luisito Vigoreaux, obtained the rights to the Miss Universe Puerto Rico franchise. Desiree's role as pageant director left her in charge with training and preparation of the island's delegate to the Miss Universe pageant. Her most successful delegate was Mayra Matos who finished as fourth runner-up in 2009. Other successful delegates were Mariana Vicente who finished in the top ten in 2010 and Viviana Ortiz and Monic Pérez who both finished in the top 16 in 2011 and 2013 respectively. 2014 delegate Gabriela Berrios was also awarded Miss Photogenic Universe but did not place in the semifinals.

On February 5, 2018, it was announced that WME/IMG had stripped Vigoreaux and Lowry of the franchise rights and awarded rights to WAPA-TV.

TV Host
1995: Tu Melodía - Telemundo PR
1997: A Fuego - Teleonce
2004: De Magazín - WAPA TV
2008: No Te Duermas - Telemundo PR
2009: Anda Pal' Cara''' - Univisión Puerto Rico
2009: Buscando La Más Bella - Telemundo PR 
2010: De Magazín, Fin De Semana'' - Telemundo PR

See also

List of Puerto Ricans
Irish immigration to Puerto Rico

References

External links
Desiree Lowry.Com
Desiree Lowry at IMDB

1972 births
Living people
Miss Puerto Rico winners
Miss Universe 1995 contestants
People from San Juan, Puerto Rico
Puerto Rican people of Irish descent